Moran Creek may refer to:

 Moran Creek (Minnesota)
 Moran Creek (Hay Creek tributary), a stream in Montana